First-seeded Maureen Connolly defeated Julia Sampson 6–3, 6–2 in the final to win the women's singles tennis title at the 1953 Australian Championships.

Seeds
The seeded players are listed below. Maureen Connolly is the champion; others show the round in which they were eliminated.

  Maureen Connolly (champion)
  Julia Sampson (finalist)
  Helen Angwin (quarterfinals)
  Mary Hawton (semifinals)
  Beryl Penrose (quarterfinals)
  Pam Southcombe (quarterfinals)
  Alison Baker (second round)
  Dorn Fogarty (semifinals)
  Nell Hall Hopman (quarterfinals)
  Gwen Thiele (second round)

Draw

Key
 Q = Qualifier
 WC = Wild card
 LL = Lucky loser
 r = Retired

Finals

Earlier rounds

Section 1

Section 2

External links
 archived results of Australian Open homepage

1953 in women's tennis
1953
1953 in Australian tennis
1953 in Australian women's sport